Tropical Storm Claudette was a 1979 tropical cyclone which was the third-wettest tropical cyclone on record in the contiguous United States. The storm caused significant flooding in eastern Texas and western Louisiana in July 1979. The eighth tropical cyclone and third named storm of the 1979 Atlantic hurricane season, Claudette developed from a tropical wave located east of the Windward Islands on July 16. It gradually strengthened and was upgraded to a tropical storm on July 17 and crossed the northern Leeward Islands later that day. As it neared landfall in Puerto Rico early on July 18, upper-level winds weakened it back to a tropical depression. Claudette remained disorganized and the National Hurricane Center operationally reported that it degenerated back into a tropical wave after crossing Puerto Rico. Late on July 18, the depression struck Dominican Republic, emerged into the Caribbean Sea on the following day. Claudette struck western Cuba on July 21, shortly before reaching the Gulf of Mexico and "regenerating" into a tropical cyclone. By July 23, Claudette regained tropical storm intensity and turned northward toward the Gulf Coast of the United States. The storm made landfall near the Texas-Louisiana border late on July 23 as a moderately strong tropical storm. It weakened slowly and drifted over land, lasting until dissipation in West Virginia on July 29.

In the Lesser Antilles, the storm brought heavy rainfall and gusty winds to several islands. Minor flooding occurred in Guadeloupe and Saint Croix. Rainfall exceeding  in some areas of Puerto Rico led to widespread agricultural damage, flooded homes and streets, and one fatality; losses were estimated at $750,000 (1979 USD). Despite its passage over Hispaniola and Cuba, impact in both regions is unknown. Claudette brought record-breaking rainfall to eastern Texas. In Alvin,  of rain fell in one day, which at one point was the record 24‑hour precipitation amount for any location in the United States. Overall, Claudette was responsible for two deaths and $400 million (1979 USD) in damage.

Meteorological history

A tropical wave, the strongest of the season at mid-tropospheric levels, emerged into the Atlantic in the second week of July. In Dakar, Senegal, winds were as high as 100 mph (155 km/h) in the  level of the atmosphere. The wave tracked westward and slowly organized. It is estimated that a tropical depression developed after a surface circulation became evident at 1200 UTC on July 16. The depression moved west-northwestward and approached the northern Lesser Antilles. As a result, the depression was upgraded to Tropical Storm Claudette later that day.

As the storm moved westward, it encountered wind shear, weakening it back to depression status when it hit Puerto Rico. Claudette moved across islands of Hispaniola and Cuba as a tropical depression before reforming in the Gulf of Mexico on July 21. Fluctuating between tropical depression and tropical storm status, the disorganized storm drifted slowly westward before making landfall along the Texas-Louisiana border on July 24. The storm stalled over Alvin, Texas, on the evening of the 25th. The storm then weakened and continued northeastward through the Ohio Valley before dissipating on July 29.

Impact
Tropical Storm Claudette killed 2 people and left $400 million (1979 USD, $1.1 billion 2005 USD).

Eastern Caribbean

In Fort-de-France, Martinique,  of rain fell in 24 hours, causing localized flooding. Only  of rain fell on Saint Barthélemy.

In the United States Virgin Islands, Claudette dropped  of rain in less than 12 hours on the island of Saint Croix. Runoff from Blue Mountain caused a normally dry creek bed to overflow, flooding several homes in the Mon Bijou area. Additionally, about 25 families were evacuated in the vicinity of Glynn by the Civil Defense.

Due to heavy rainfall, about 25 families were evacuated in Quebrada Limón by the Civil Defense. One fatality occurred when an attempted to drive across a swollen creek near Guayanilla. A bridge along the Coayuco River linking Yauco to Quebrada Limón was damaged by the abnormally high water levels of the river. Minor flooding was reported in the Ponce Area was the Río Portugués and Río Bucaná overflowed. Excess rainfall caused the Río Guanajibo to inundate streets to a "considerable" extent in Mayagüez. Widespread agricultural damage was reported, especially in Las Marías, Maricao, Sabana Grande, and San Sebastián. Overall, losses in Puerto Rico amounted to about $750,000 (1979 USD).

United States

Texas
Claudette produced torrential rains in both Texas and Louisiana when it made landfall. The highest one-day total was reported near Alvin, Texas where  of rain fell. This remained as the highest twenty-four-hour rainfall record for any location in the United States until the 2018 Kauai floods, when  of rain fell in 24 hours in Waipā Garden, Kauai, Hawaii. Two other towns also reported rainfall totals exceeding . Many residents had to be rescued from low-lying areas that were flooded.

Louisiana
As a result, significant coastal flooding occurred.  of Louisiana Highway 82 was either seriously damaged or destroyed, while  of secondary roads were impacted in Cameron Parish. Several boats in the region capsized at the beaches. Seven homes and fishing camps were significantly damaged or destroyed by waves and strong winds in Johnson Bayou.

Elsewhere
In Missouri, rainfall exceeded  in some areas. The James River overflowed near Springfield, trapping two elderly women in their home. Heavy rainfall in Farmington backed-up sewer drains, flooded basements, and blew-off large manhole covers. Flood water swept away a car in Ste. Genevieve, washed-out a portion of a sidewalk, and toppled fencing along a baseball field. At the Cover Wagon RV park in Waynesville, flooding damage was approximately $5,000. In Rolla, floodwaters between  forced the evacuation of eight families, and washed out driveways. Cars, sheds, fences, kennels, and butane tanks were swept to other locations. Numerous roads were closed in Christian, Greene, and Taney Counties.

As the remnants of Claudette moved inland, it dumped heavy rains across the Midwest and Ohio Valley. Flooding was reported in Missouri, where heavy rains caused significant flooding near St. Louis. In Indiana, about 9 inches of rain fell and isolated flooding was reported.

Aftermath
On July 28, 1979, then-President of the United States Jimmy Carter issued a disaster declaration for Texas, allowing the counties of Brazoria, Chambers, Dallas, Galveston, Jefferson and Orange to be eligible for government aid in order to recover from flooding.

See also

List of Texas hurricanes
List of wettest tropical cyclones in Texas
Other storms of the same name
Hurricane Laura - a stronger storm that would take a similar path to Claudette

References

External links

 Puerto Rico Hurricanes and Tropical Storms

1979 Atlantic hurricane season
Hurricanes in Antigua and Barbuda
Hurricanes in Sint Eustatius
Hurricanes in Anguilla
Hurricanes in Saint Martin (island)
Hurricanes in Saba (island)
1979 natural disasters in the United States
History of British Antigua and Barbuda
1979 in Saint Kitts-Nevis-Anguilla
Floods in Texas
Atlantic tropical storms
Tropical cyclones that lingered over Texas